Roger Joe (born 21 January 1986 in Port Vila) is a football defender from Vanuatu. He currently plays for Vanuatu Premia Divisen side Tafea FC and the Vanuatu national football team.

International matches

References

External links
 

1986 births
Living people
Association football defenders
Vanuatuan footballers
Vanuatu international footballers
Tafea F.C. players
Yatel F.C. players
2004 OFC Nations Cup players